Not be confused with Tiggiano.

Triggiano is a small town (comune) in the southern part of the Metropolitan City of Bari and region of Apulia, southern Italy. It lies a few miles inland from the port of Bari on the Adriatic Sea.

Overview
The town originated in the 14th century around a "university". The "Rione Ponte" or Bridge quarter, so named for the moving bridge that allowed access to the town, retains medieval structures. Among the landmarks in the town are:
 Santa Maria Veterana hypogeum near the "Rione Ponte".
 Lama San Giorgio zone.
 San Lorenzo church in the grotto.
 Madonna della Croce church with its frescoes
 Rione Ponte

In 2021, the population of Triggiano was around 26,200 persons. Triggiano is well connected to the Bari downtown via "Sud-Est" railways and buses. Triggiano has important communities of emigrants in the United States and Venezuela. The city is a sister city of Addison, Illinois, in the United States.

During the "Madonna della Croce" city remembrance, immigrates from US and from Venezuela use to come back to visit, or to show their children, their origin. Exiles would donate money in honor of the "Madonna della Croce". This commemoration take place on the 3rd week end of September.

References

External links
 Official website

Cities and towns in Apulia